An XML database is a data persistence software system that allows data to be specified, and sometimes stored, in XML format. This data can be queried, transformed, exported and returned to a calling system. XML databases are a flavor of document-oriented databases which are in turn a category of NoSQL database.

Rationale for XML in databases 
There are a number of reasons to directly specify data in XML or other document formats such as JSON. For XML in particular, they include:

 An enterprise may have a lot of XML in an existing standard format
 Data may need to be exposed or ingested as XML, so using another format such as relational forces double-modeling of the data
 XML is very well suited to sparse data, deeply nested data and mixed content (such as text with embedded markup tags)
 XML is human readable whereas relational tables require expertise to access
 Metadata is often available as XML
 Semantic web data is available as RDF/XML
 Provides a solution for Object-relational impedance mismatch

Steve O'Connell gives one reason for the use of XML in databases: the increasingly common use of XML for data transport, which has meant that "data is extracted from databases and put into XML documents and vice-versa". It may prove more efficient (in terms of conversion costs) and easier to store the data in XML format.  In content-based applications, the ability of the native XML database also minimizes the need for extraction or entry of metadata to support searching and navigation.

XML-enabled databases 
XML-enabled databases typically offer one or more of the following approaches to storing XML within the traditional relational structure:
XML is stored into a CLOB (Character large object)
XML is `shredded` into a series of Tables based on a Schema
XML is stored into a native XML Type as defined by ISO Standard 9075-14

RDBMS that support the ISO XML Type are:
IBM DB2 (pureXML)
Microsoft SQL Server
Oracle Database
PostgreSQL

Typically an XML-enabled database is best suited where the majority of data are non-XML. For datasets where the majority of data are XML, a native XML database is better suited.

Example of XML Type Query in IBM DB2 SQL 
select
   id, vol, xmlquery('$j/name', passing journal as "j") as name 
from
   journals
where 
   xmlexists('$j[licence="CreativeCommons"]', passing journal as "j")

Native XML databases 

Native XML databases are especially tailored for working with XML data. As managing XML as large strings would be inefficient, and due to the hierarchical nature of XML, custom optimized data structures are used for storage and querying. This usually increases performance both in terms of read-only queries and updates. XML nodes and documents are the fundamental unit of (logical) storage, just as a relational database has fields and rows.

The standard for querying XML data per W3C recommendation is XQuery; the latest version is XQuery 3.1. XQuery includes XPath as a sub-language and XML itself is a valid sub-syntax of XQuery. In addition to XPath, some XML databases support XSLT as a method of transforming documents or query results retrieved from the database.

Language features

Supported APIs

Data-centric XML datasets 
For data-centric XML datasets, the unique and distinct keyword search method, namely, XDMA for XML databases is designed and developed based on dual indexing and mutual summation.

References

External links 
 Ranking of Native XML DBMS by popularity, updated monthly, from DB-Engines
 XML Databases - The Business Case, Charles Foster, June 2008 - Talks about the current state of Databases and data persistence, how the current Relational Database model is starting to crack at the seams and gives an insight into a strong alternative for today's requirements.
 An XML-based Database of Molecular Pathways (2005-06-02) Speed / Performance comparisons of eXist, X-Hive, Sedna and Qizx/open
 XML Native Database Systems: Review of Sedna, Ozone, NeoCoreXMS 2006
 XML Data Stores: Emerging Practices
 Bhargava, P.; Rajamani, H.; Thaker, S.; Agarwal, A. (2005) XML Enabled Relational Databases, Texas, The University of Texas at Austin.
 Initiative for XML Databases
  XML and Databases, Ronald Bourret, September 2005
  The State of Native XML Databases, Elliotte Rusty Harold, August 13, 2007

XML
Data management
Data modeling